The conflicts between the regency of Algiers and the Cherifian dynasties or Algerian-Sherifian conflicts are, within the framework of the conflicts opposing Morocco to the Ottoman Empire and its dependencies, a series of wars between, on the one hand, the regency of Algiers and its allies - the local sultanates or tribal confederations - and, on the other hand, the Cherifian Saadian and Alawite dynasties that have ruled Morocco since the 16th century.

The origins of these conflicts are multiple and overlapping. The state-owned enterprise of the regency of Algiers in the central Maghreb around Algiers as a new political center and its integration with the Ottoman Empire (in 1520) was at the expense of the Zayyanids of Tlemcen in the west. The latter in recurrent conflicts at the beginning of the sixteenth century with the regency on the one hand and the Spaniards on the other end up seeing their domain integrated with the regency. Their weakening stirred the Saadian lusts and their claim on the western Algerian. If the regency of Algiers confirms its control over Tlemcen and Orania it does not have the means to launch long campaigns in the Saharan confines that it delegates to various tribal confederations like the Ouled Sidi Cheikh. The Saadians were blocked to the north by the Spanish Empire and the Regency of Algiers then find a South-Saharan outlet for the extension of their Empire.

These conflicts and the resulting agreements foreshadow the borders and delimitations between the modern nation-states of the Maghreb.

The establishment of the regency of Algiers (16th century)

Collapse of the Zayyanids of Tlemcen 
The weakening of the Zayyanids of Tlemcen, playing on their alliances with Spain, the Turks of Algiers and the Wattasids to maintain themselves, opened up a period of political emptiness in western Algeria. The foundation of the regency of Algiers (1512-1529) then its integration into the Ottoman Empire will be done at the expense of the Zayyanids in the west and the Hafsids in the east. The regency of Algiers, directed by the exogenous Turkish element of its militia, extended its influence to the west through the play of maraboutic alliances and brotherhoods. However, the advent of the Cherifian dynasties in Fez, with the Saadians in 1550, upset this game of alliances. Indeed, the regency of Algiers could not count on the support of the maraboutics against the sovereigns claiming a Cherifian origin (i.e. descending from Prophet Muhammad). Negotiations therefore began concerning the territories formerly under Zayyanids suzerainty, which were not successful.

Saadian attempts in Oran 
In 1545, the Saadians allied themselves with the Spaniards. The Cherifian army took Tlemcen without fighting in 1550 and decided to march on Algiers. The beylerbeys of the regency of Algiers and the Sultan of the Beni Abbas then concluded the pact of Aguemoun Ath Khiar. They retook the city of Tlemcen and Oranie in 1551; The victory was exploited politically by the Turks of Algiers and played a role in the formation of Algeria (prefiguring its borders). This conflict opened a period of Algerian-Cherifian hostility which only ceased in 1585 with the intervention of the Ottoman sultan. From then on, for about a century, the Moulouya border was respected.

On the other hand, the fall of the Zayyanids of Tlemcen opened the way to the Saharan conquests of the Saadians who were anxious to control the trans-Saharan axes that had been left vacant. The regency cannot engage in distant Saharan expeditions, it is however mentioned that a troop was sent from Algiers to the Gourara towards the end of the 16th century at the request of the Ksourians in the face of the rezzous from Tafilalt. The Touat and the Gourara are then subjected to a temptation of local withdrawal and are independent in fact.

Notable battles 
Campaign of Tlemcen (1551)
Capture of Fez (1554)
Campaign of Tlemcen (1557)
Battle of Wadi al-Laban (1558)
Battle of Moulouya (1691)
Siege of Oran (1693)
Battle of Chelif (1701)

References

Bibliography 
 
 
 
 

16th-century conflicts
17th-century conflicts
18th-century conflicts
Ottoman Algeria
Military history of Morocco
Military history of Algeria